This is a list of artists associated with The London Group:

References

 
Full list of current, past and founder members of The London Group

London Group
British art
London-related lists